Black River is an unincorporated community located in the town of Superior, Douglas County, Wisconsin, United States.

References

External links

Unincorporated communities in Douglas County, Wisconsin
Unincorporated communities in Wisconsin